The Shire of Goulburn was a local government area about  north of Melbourne, the state capital of Victoria, Australia.

History

Goulburn was first incorporated as a road district on 24 November 1868, and became a shire on 24 March 1871. On 16 May 1956, Goulburn annexed land from the Shire of Waranga.

On 18 November 1994, the Shire of Goulburn was abolished, and along with the Shires of Euroa and Violet Town, and some neighbouring districts, was merged into the newly created Shire of Strathbogie.

Wards

The Shire of Goulburn was divided into three ridings on 16 May 1956, each of which elected three councillors:
 Central Riding
 East Riding
 North Riding

Towns and localities
 Goulburn Weir
 Graytown
 Locksley
 Longwood
 Mitchellstown
 Moorilim
 Nagambie*
 Ruffy
 Tabilk
 Tarcombe
 Wahring

* Council seat.

Population

* Estimate in the 1958 Victorian Year Book.

References

External links
 Victorian Places - Goulburn Shire

Goulburn